Elliott Estill Dent (December 8, 1887 in Baltimore, Maryland – November 25, 1974 in Birmingham, Alabama) was a pitcher in Major League Baseball. He pitched from 1909 to 1912 for the Brooklyn Dodgers.  He won a total of only four games as a major league pitcher -- but was the winning pitcher over all-time wins leader Cy Young in Young's very last major league game, on October 6, 1911.  

Dent's son, Elliot, Jr., was awarded a Distinguished Service Cross for his aerial combat victories as part of the U. S. Air Force 7th Fighter Squadron of the 49th Fighter Group in World War II.

External links

1887 births
1974 deaths
Baseball players from Maryland
Major League Baseball pitchers
Brooklyn Superbas players
Brooklyn Dodgers players
Baseball players from Birmingham, Alabama
Winston-Salem Twins players
New Haven Prairie Hens players
New Haven Murlins players
Newark Indians players
Atlanta Crackers players
San Francisco Seals (baseball) players
Venice Tigers players
Vernon Tigers players
United States Army Air Forces pilots of World War II
United States Army Air Forces officers